The wildlife of Thailand includes its flora and fauna and their natural habitats.

Fauna

Mammals

There are 264 mammal species in Thailand on the IUCN Red List. Of these species, three are critically endangered, 24 are vulnerable, and two are near-threatened. One of the species listed for Thailand is considered to be extinct.

Fish 
Fish of Thailand

Amphibians

Reptiles

Birds

The birds of Thailand number nearly one thousand species, of which approximately 45 are rare or accidental. At least seven bird species previously found in Thailand have since been made locally extinct, and approximately fifty of Thailand's bird species are globally threatened.

In 1991, it was estimated that 159 resident and 23 migratory species were endangered or vulnerable due to forest clearance, illegal logging, hunting and habitat degradation, especially in the lowlands. The species most affected are large water birds whose wetland habitat has been largely lost to agriculture, and forest species, as deforestation for agriculture and logging have removed and degraded portions of the woodlands.

Insects 
 Cicada

Ants

Butterflies 

There are about 1,100 known butterfly species from Thailand.

Bhutanitis lidderdalii
Parantica aglea
Parantica melaneus
Papilio clytia
Papilio paradoxus
Tirumala limniace
Tirumala septentrionis

Molluscs

There are at least 23 known families, 57 genera and 125 species of land gastropods from Eastern Thailand.

There are at least 8 known species of freshwater gastropods and at least 2 species of freshwater bivalves from the Sakaeo Province in the Eastern Thailand.

Flora
Flora of Thailand
Garden angelica
Luculia gratissima
Meconopsis villosa
Persicaria affinis
Ruellia capitata

See also 
 Wildlife of Phitsanulok Province
 Environmental issues in Thailand

References

External links
Birdwatching in Thailand
List of All Thailand Snakes

Thailand